The 2023 Newfoundland and Labrador Tankard, the men's provincial curling championship for Newfoundland and Labrador, was held from January 25 to 29 at the RE/MAX Centre in St. John's, Newfoundland and Labrador.  The event was held in conjunction with the 2023 Newfoundland and Labrador Scotties Tournament of Hearts, the provincial women's championship.

The winning Nathan Young rink represented Newfoundland and Labrador at the 2023 Tim Hortons Brier in London, Ontario finishing seventh in Pool A with a 2–6 record.

Teams
The teams are listed as follows:

Round robin standings
After Draw 7

Round robin results
All draws are listed in Newfoundland Time (UTC−03:30).

Draw 1
Wednesday, January 25, 1:30 pm

Draw 2
Wednesday, January 25, 7:00 pm

Draw 3
Thursday, January 26, 1:30 pm

Draw 4
Thursday, January 26, 7:00 pm

Draw 5
Friday, January 27, 1:30 pm

Draw 6
Friday, January 27, 7:00 pm

Draw 7
Saturday, January 28, 9:00 am

Tiebreaker
Saturday, January 28, 1:30 pm

Playoffs

Semifinal
Saturday, January 28, 7:00 pm

Final
Sunday, January 29, 2:00 pm

References

External links

2023 Tim Hortons Brier
Tankard, 2023
Tankard, 2023
Tankard, 2023
January 2023 sports events in Canada